This is a list of electoral results for the Electoral district of Mornington in Victorian state elections.

Members for Mornington

Election results

Elections in the 2020s

Elections in the 2010s

Elections in the 2000s

Elections in the 1990s

Elections in the 1980s

Elections in the 1960s

Elections in the 1950s

Elections in the 1940s

 Preferences were not distributed.

Elections in the 1930s

 Preferences were not distributed.

Elections in the 1920s

 Alfred Downward was the sitting Nationalist MP for Mornington, but changed to the Victorian Farmers Union before this election.

Elections in the 1910s

References

 

Victoria (Australia) state electoral results by district